Jacob Anthony deGrom (born June 19, 1988), is an American professional baseball pitcher for the Texas Rangers of Major League Baseball (MLB). He has previously played in MLB for the New York Mets. Prior to playing professionally, deGrom attended Stetson University and played college baseball for the Stetson Hatters.

DeGrom began playing baseball as a shortstop and was converted into a pitcher during his junior year at Stetson. The Mets selected him in the ninth round of the 2010 MLB draft, and he made his major league debut with the Mets on May 15, 2014. In the same year, deGrom was named the National League's (NL) Rookie of the Month twice, and the NL Rookie of the Year. In 2015, 2018, 2019, and 2021 deGrom was selected as an MLB All-Star. In 2018, deGrom was the NL leader in earned run average and won the Cy Young Award. In 2019, he led the NL in strikeouts and won the Cy Young Award for the second year in a row. In 2020, he again led the National League in strikeouts.

Amateur career
DeGrom attended Calvary Christian Academy, a small school in Ormond Beach, Florida where he played for the school's baseball and basketball teams. As a basketball player, he was voted the District 9 Class 1A player of the year by the Florida Athletic Coaches Association and selected to the all-state third team for Class 1A.

As a senior baseball player the Florida Sports Writers Association named deGrom to the All-Florida second team. He also played American Legion baseball, where he was noticed by the coaches for the Stetson Hatters, the college baseball team of Stetson University.

After not being selected in the Major League Baseball draft out of high school, deGrom enrolled at Stetson and played for the Hatters. He was exclusively a shortstop during his freshman and sophomore seasons. Though he was considered a good fielder with a strong throwing arm, deGrom was a light hitter with a career .263 batting average. He made his first appearance as a pitcher in May 2009. In the summer of 2009, between his sophomore and junior years, deGrom received an invitation to play collegiate summer baseball for the DeLand Suns of the Florida Collegiate Summer League, which he declined after discovering that they wanted him to play as a pitcher.

When deGrom returned to Stetson that fall, the team used him as a relief pitcher, filling the role of their closer, in addition to playing shortstop. He quickly became one of Stetson's best pitchers, so the team moved deGrom into their starting rotation midway through the season.  In addition to a fastball, deGrom learned to throw a changeup and a slider. Major league scouts began to take notice of deGrom when he pitched against Chris Sale of Florida Gulf Coast University. In the game deGrom hit his only home run of the season against Chris Sale. He made 12 starts for the Hatters, pitching to a 4–5 win–loss record with a 4.48 earned run average.

Professional career

Minor leagues
The New York Mets selected deGrom in the ninth round as a pitcher, with the 272nd overall selection, of the 2010 Major League Baseball draft. He signed with the Mets, receiving a $95,000 signing bonus. The Mets assigned deGrom to the Kingsport Mets of the rookie-level Appalachian League where he made six starts before he was diagnosed with a partial tear of the ulnar collateral ligament (UCL) in his pitching elbow. He attempted to rehabilitate his arm for four months, but underwent Tommy John surgery to repair the UCL in October. He did not pitch in 2011 while he recovered from the surgery. While rehabilitating deGrom worked on his changeup with Johan Santana.

DeGrom pitched for the Savannah Sand Gnats of the Class A South Atlantic League and the St. Lucie Mets of the Class A-Advanced Florida State League in 2012, finishing the year with a 2.43 earned run average in 19 games started. In 2013, he began the season with St. Lucie, but was promoted to the Binghamton Mets of the Class AA Eastern League after two starts due to injuries to Binghamton's Luis Mateo and Cory Mazzoni. He received a promotion to the Las Vegas 51s of the Class AAA Pacific Coast League in June after the Mets promoted Zack Wheeler and Carlos Torres to the major leagues and traded Collin McHugh. He had a combined 4.51 earned run average for the season, due to a broken finger suffered during the offseason, which altered the way he threw the ball.

The Mets added deGrom to their 40-man roster on November 20, 2013, to protect him from being eligible in the Rule 5 draft. During the offseason, deGrom improved his mechanics, and learned to throw a curveball. He began the 2014 season with Las Vegas, and had a 4–0 win–loss record and a 2.58 earned run average in his first seven games started.

New York Mets

2014
The Mets promoted deGrom to the major leagues on May 12, 2014, after Gonzalez Germen was placed on the disabled list. The Mets planned to use deGrom in relief, but an injury to Dillon Gee required the Mets to insert him into their starting rotation. DeGrom made his major league debut on May 15 against cross-town rival New York Yankees in Citi Field. He faced fellow rookie Chase Whitley, also making his major league debut. He pitched seven innings, allowing only one run and striking out six, but the Yankees shut out the Mets and won 1–0. DeGrom also collected his first major league hit in the game in his first career at bat. It was the first hit by a Mets pitcher in the 2014 season ending an 0-for-64 hitless streak, the worst collective mark by a pitching staff to begin a season in major league history.

DeGrom compiled four quality starts in his first four major league starts, but did not record a win in any of them. On July 8, deGrom pitched seven scoreless innings and recorded 11 strikeouts in giving the Mets their 4,000th franchise victory. Along with Steve Cishek of the Miami Marlins, deGrom was named the National League's (NL) Co-Player of the Week for the period of July 21 to 27 after allowing only one earned run in two starts that week. He was named the NL Rookie of the Month for July. On August 11, deGrom was placed on the disabled list with rotator cuff tendinitis. Rafael Montero was called up on August 12 in deGrom's place. On August 23, Montero was re-sent back to the 51s to make room for deGrom coming off the disabled list.

On September 15, 2014, deGrom faced the Marlins and struck out his first eight batters, tying the major league record. Near the end of the season, deGrom was shut down for the year, ending his season with a 9–6 record, a 2.69 earned run average and 144 strikeouts. DeGrom collected a second Rookie of the Month award for his September performance, and, after the regular season ended, he was named the 2014 Sporting News NL Rookie of the Year by the Baseball Writers' Association of America, receiving first place votes on 26 of the 30 ballots. He was the first Met to receive the honor since Dwight Gooden in 1984.

2015
DeGrom and Clayton Kershaw of the Los Angeles Dodgers were selected as NL Co-Players of the Week for the week ending June 7, 2015. He began the 2015 season with an 8–6 win–loss record and a 2.30 earned run average through the end of June, and was named to the NL roster in the 2015 MLB All-Star Game. During the All-Star Game, deGrom struck out the three batters he faced on ten pitches, becoming the first person to do so since pitch counts were recorded. DeGrom pitched to a 14–8 record with a 2.54 earned run average and a 0.99 walks plus hits per inning pitched ratio during the 2015 season.

Starting Game 1 of the 2015 National League Division Series, he allowed no runs and five hits over seven innings pitched and tied a Mets franchise postseason record with 13 strikeouts (set by Tom Seaver, Game 1 of the 1973 National League Championship Series). DeGrom won the deciding Game 5 with a six-inning, two-run effort. In Game 3 of the 2015 NLCS against the Chicago Cubs, deGrom pitched seven-inning game, allowing just two runs on four hits, one walk and seven strikeouts, putting the Mets ahead 3–0 and within one game of their first World Series appearance since the 2000 Subway Series.
DeGrom started Game 2 of the 2015 World Series on October 28; he allowed four runs on six hits and three walks over five innings and took the loss as the Royals went up, 2–0, in the series.

Following the season, deGrom received a Wilson Defensive Player of the Year Award as the best defensive player statistically at his position in Major League Baseball. He also placed seventh in Cy Young Award voting.

2016
DeGrom initially refused to sign the 2016 contract for the $607,000 salary assigned to him. Not yet eligible for salary arbitration, deGrom was bound by the MLB Collective Bargaining Agreement to accept the salary assigned to him by his club. He relented and reluctantly capitulated to signing his contract early in spring training.

On July 17 at Citizens Bank Park in Philadelphia, deGrom pitched a shutout against the Philadelphia Phillies, allowing only one hit and one walk while striking out seven batters. His game score of 97 was tied for second-best in Mets history in a nine-inning game. DeGrom's final pitching appearance of the season came on September 1, when he faced the Miami Marlins. He underwent season-ending surgery on his ulnar nerve in late September in order to relieve discomfort in his elbow and numbness in his fingers which had plagued him during the 2016 season.

2017
Eligible for salary arbitration for the first time, deGrom and the Mets avoided an arbitration hearing by agreeing to a salary of $4.05 million for the 2017 season.

On June 18, 2017, deGrom hit his first career home run at Citi Field against Joe Ross of the Washington Nationals. deGrom was named NL Player of the Week for the week of June 12–18 after hitting his first home run, posting a 0.53 earned run average, allowing eight hits, striking out 12 and walking six in 17 innings over two starts. DeGrom recorded wins in eight consecutive starts from June 12 until July 24, tying a franchise record previously set by Seaver, David Cone and Bobby Jones. DeGrom had the first stolen base of his career on August 4 off of Yu Darvish and Yasmani Grandal of the Dodgers. He became the first Mets pitcher to steal a base since Óliver Pérez in 2008.

Of the seven potential starting pitchers who began the season with the Mets, deGrom was the only one who finished the 2017 season without spending any time on the disabled list. deGrom finished the 2017 season with a record of 15-10 and a 3.53 earned run average. DeGrom finished eighth in voting for the 2017 NL Cy Young Award.

2018
DeGrom and the Mets agreed on a $7.4 million salary for the 2018 season. On May 6, the Mets placed deGrom on the 10 day disabled list, retroactive to May 3, with a hyperextended pitching elbow. DeGrom had suffered the minor injury while batting during his May 2 start against the Braves. Owning a 1.68 earned run average that led the major leagues, deGrom was named to the 2018 Major League Baseball All-Star Game.

During the All-Star Break, Brodie Van Wagenen, deGrom's sports agent, called for the Mets to engage in contract extension talks, or to "seriously consider trade opportunities now". On September 3, deGrom tied a major league record with his 25th straight start allowing three or fewer runs. DeGrom recorded his 1,000th career strikeout in his final start of the season on September 26 at Citi Field.

DeGrom finished the season 10–9 with a 1.70 earned run average, which led the majors and was the third-lowest of any pitcher with 30 starts in a season since the pitching mound was lowered following the 1968 season. For the 2018 season he led the majors in lowest home runs per nine innings (0.41). On November 14, deGrom was announced as the National League Cy Young Award winner; he received all but one first place vote. His 10 wins were the fewest in history by a Cy Young Award-winning starting pitcher. DeGrom finished fifth in the National League Most Valuable Player voting and was the only player other than award winner Christian Yelich to receive a first place vote.

2019
During the 2018-19 offseason, the Mets hired Van Wagenen as their general manager. DeGrom and the Mets agreed to a $17 million salary for the 2019 season, the largest annual raise ever for an arbitration-eligible player. With Van Wagenen now negotiating for the Mets rather than deGrom, the two sides agreed to a five-year, $137.5 million contract extension with an option for the 2024 season during spring training in 2019. DeGrom started for the Mets on Opening Day against Max Scherzer, the 2018 Cy Young Award runner-up to deGrom and the 2017 Cy Young Award winner. DeGrom set a career high in strikeouts in his next start on April 3 with 14.
DeGrom began the first half of the 2019 season with a 4–7 record and a 3.27 earned run average while striking out 138 batters. He was then named to the NL roster in the 2019 Major League Baseball All-Star Game. DeGrom had a remarkable second half, posting a 7–1 record with a 1.44 earned run average and 117 strikeouts. He won his second straight Cy Young Award in a near-unanimous vote, receiving 29 of 30 first-place votes, becoming the 11th pitcher in history to win back-to-back Cy Young Awards.

In December 2019, the New York Post named him their New York Athlete of the Decade over such competition as Eli Manning, Henrik Lundqvist, Mariano Rivera, and Derek Jeter.

2020
In the shortened 60-game 2020 season, deGrom was 4–2 with a 2.38 earned run average, and led the National League in strikeouts for the second consecutive season, with 104. He led the NL in strikeouts per 9 innings pitched (13.765), was 3rd in walks plus hits per inning pitched (0.956) and hits per 9 innings pitched (6.221), 4th in earned run average, 5th in wild pitches (4), 6th in win–loss percentage (.667) and home runs per 9 innings pitched (0.927), and 8th in walks per 9 innings pitched (2.382). He led the NL in stolen bases allowed, with 13. His $25 million salary was the 10th-highest in the NL. He finished third in NL Cy Young Award voting.

2021
On April 23, 2021, in a start against the Washington Nationals, deGrom set a record for most strikeouts in the first four starts of a season with 50. He pitched a complete game shutout with a career-high 15 strikeouts, only 2 hits, and no walks. In addition, deGrom went 2–4 at the plate with 2 runs and a run batted in RBI. In the same game, he lowered his career earned run average to 2.55, setting a franchise record. He was named April's National League Pitcher of the Month for the first time in his career. On June 5, deGrom threw seven scoreless innings against the San Diego Padres, lowering his earned run average to 0.62, the lowest by any pitcher in history through nine starts. On June 11, deGrom pitched six scoreless innings against the Padres, improving his earned run average to 0.56, the lowest by any pitcher through his first ten starts of the season. DeGrom had also thrown 100 strikeouts in just  innings, achieving the mark in the fewest innings since the mound was moved to its current distance from home plate in 1893. At that point in the season, deGrom also had more runs batted in on the year (6) than earned runs allowed (4). Through 12 starts, deGrom's walks plus hits per inning pitched was 0.51. Since at least 1901, no major league pitcher has had a walks plus hits to inning pitched ratio that low during 12 consecutive starts. He was named to the 2021 Major League Baseball All-Star Game, his fourth career nomination, although he announced he did not play. On July 7, deGrom earned his 1,500th career strikeout against Brewers shortstop Willy Adames. He achieved it in 198 career starts, becoming the 2nd-fastest pitcher to reach the mark behind Yu Darvish who did it in 197 career starts.

On July 18, deGrom began to feel tightness in his forearm during a bullpen session and was subsequently placed by the Mets onto the 10-day injured list. Later in the month, deGrom also started feeling soreness in his elbow. An MRI revealed inflammation in his elbow, but with no structural damage. On August 20, deGrom was transferred to the 60-day IL to make room for relief pitcher Heath Hembree. deGrom did not pitch for the remainder of the 2021 season.

Overall in 2021, deGrom posted a 7–2 record in 15 starts and recorded a 1.08 earned run average with 146 strikeouts and 11 walks in 92 innings. He was a finalist for the Silver Slugger Award, which was won by Max Fried.

2022 
DeGrom suffered a stress reaction, the precursor to a stress fracture in his right scapula during spring training, an injury which caused him to miss the beginning of the 2022 season. DeGrom began a rehab assignment with the St. Lucie Mets in July 2022 and, after two successful starts, progressed to the Triple-A Syracuse Mets.

DeGrom made his 2022 season debut for the Mets on August 2 against the Washington Nationals, allowing one run and striking out six in five innings. A September 13 start against the Cubs was deGrom's 39th consecutive start allowing three or fewer earned runs, tying a major league record set by Jim Scott of the Chicago White Sox in 1914. In his next start, on September 18, he broke Scott's record. At the end of the regular season, deGrom allowed at least three runs in four straight games, marking his worst stretch since 2017. However, deGrom bounced back in Game 2 of the Wild Card Series against the San Diego Padres, as the Mets faced elimination. That night deGrom allowed just two runs in six innings pitched with eight strikeouts, as the Mets won the game 7–3, although they eventually lost the series in Game 3. The stat line for deGrom in 2022 included a 3.08 earned run average over 11 starts, with 102 strikeouts.

Following the end of the season, deGrom opted out of his contract, joining a group of several other Mets entering free agency.

Texas Rangers
On December 2, 2022, deGrom signed a five-year, $185 million contract with the Texas Rangers.

Personal life

DeGrom is from DeLeon Springs, Florida. He was raised by his parents, Tony, an AT&T lineman, and Tammy, a customer service representative for a credit card rewards program. Tony deGrom built a batting cage in the backyard for his son to practice. Jacob deGrom credits his father for his quiet intensity and remembers demanding sessions playing catch in their yard. He says his father said to stay humble. He is one of three children of Tony and Tammy; his sisters are named Sarah and Jessica. He grew up an Atlanta Braves fan.

Shortly after graduating from high school deGrom met his wife, Stacey. They were married in November 2014 and live in DeLand, Florida. They had a son in April 2016 and their second child, a girl was born in February 2018. They have a Morkie which is a combination of a Maltese and a Yorkie.

At Stetson deGrom began to grow out his hair. His starts with the Mets led to the trending hashtag on Twitter of "#hairwego". His hair inspired a promotional "Jacob deGrom Hair Hat" giveaway at Citi Field during the 2016 season. After learning that an unnamed major league hitter said that deGrom's hair made it harder to pick up the ball out of his hand, deGrom said in 2016 that he would never cut his hair. However, he cut his hair during the 2017-18 offseason, saying that it could add speed to his fastball and also that he was tired of having long hair.

See also

 All-MLB Team
 List of New York Mets team records
 List of New York Mets Opening Day starting pitchers
 MLB annual ERA Leaders • Career ERA Leaders
 MLB Cy Young Award Winners
 MLB Rookies of the Year
 MLB Strikeout leaders
 Major League Baseball Rookie of the Month Award
 Major League Baseball Player of the Week Award
 New York Mets award winners and league leaders
 SN Pitcher of the Year Award Winners
 Wilson Defensive Player of the Year Award

References

External links

 

1988 births
American people of Belgian descent
American people of Dutch descent
Baseball players from Florida
Binghamton Mets players
Cy Young Award winners
Kingsport Mets players
Las Vegas 51s players
Living people
Major League Baseball pitchers
Major League Baseball Rookie of the Year Award winners
National League All-Stars
National League ERA champions
National League strikeout champions
New York Mets players
People from DeLand, Florida
Savannah Sand Gnats players
St. Lucie Mets players
Stetson Hatters baseball players
Syracuse Mets players
People from DeLeon Springs, Florida